Eileen (  or  ) is an Irish feminine given name anglicised from Eibhlín and may refer to:

People

Artists
Eileen Agar (1899–1991), British Surrealist painter and photographer
Eileen Fisher (born 1950), clothing retailer and designer
Eileen Folson (1956–2007), Broadway composer
Eileen Ford (1922–2014), American model agency executive
Eileen Gray (1878–1976), Irish furniture designer and architect
Eileen Hazell (1903–1984), Canadian sculptor and potter
Eileen Ramsay (1915-2017), British maritime photographer
Eileen Shields (born 1970), American footwear designer and entrepreneur

Entertainers
Eileen (singer) (born 1941), American-born singer in France
Eileen Atkins (born 1934), English actress
Eileen Barton (1924–2006), American singer
Eileen Bellomo, member of rock group The Stilettos
Eileen April Boylan (born 1987), Filipina/Irish-American actress
Eileen Brennan (1932–2013), American actress
Eileen Catterson, Scottish fashion model and former Miss Scotland
Eileen Daly (born 1963), English actress, singer and director
Eileen Davidson (born 1959), American film actress
Eileen Derbyshire (born 1930), English character actress
Eileen DeSandre, American actress
Eileen Essell (1922–2015), Irish actress
Eileen Farrell (1920–2002), American opera and concert singer
Eileen Fulton (born 1933), American actress
Eileen Heckart (1919–2001), American actress
Eileen Helsby (born 1937), British actress
Eileen Herlie (1918–2008), Scottish-American actress
Eileen Ivers (born 1965), Irish-American musician
Eileen Joyce (1908–1991), Australian pianist
Eileen McCallum (born 1936), Scottish actress
Eileen O'Brien (actress), English actress
Eileen Pollock (1947–2020), Northern Ireland actress
Eileen Rodgers (1930–2003), American singer and Broadway performer
Eileen Rose (born 1965), American singer/songwriter
Eileen Ryan, American actress
Eileen Sedgwick (1898–1991), American silent film actress
Eileen Walsh (born 1977), Irish actress
Eileen Way (1911–1994), English actress
Eileen Whitfield, Canadian journalist and playwright
Eileen Wilson (1923-2018), American television star
Eileen Yeow (born 1972), Singaporean actress

Politicians
Eileen Anderson (born 1928), Hawaii politician
Eileen Bell (born 1943), Northern Ireland politician
Eileen Desmond (1932–2005), British politician
Eileen C. Dugan (1945–1996), New York politician
Eileen Gordon (born 1946), United Kingdom politician
Eileen Hickey (New York politician) (1945–1999), New York politician
Eileen M. Hickey (1886–1960), Northern Irish politician
Eileen Lemass (born 1932), Irish politician
Eileen Malloy (born 1954), US ambassador
Eileen Paisley, Baroness Paisley of St George's (born 1931), Northern Irish politician
Eileen Parsons, British Virgin Islands politician

Sportspeople
Eileen Ash (1911–2021), English cricketer
Eileen Coparropa (born 1981), freestyle swimmer from Panama
Eileen Ellison (1910–1967), English Grand Prix racer
Eileen Gu (born 2003), Chinese freestyle skier
Eileen Hiscock (1909–1958), British athlete
Eileen McNamara (born 1952), equestrian
Eileen O'Keeffe (born 1981), Irish hammer thrower
Eileen Bennett Whittingstall (1907–1979), UK tennis player

Writers
Eileen Albrizio (born 1960), American writer
Eileen Chang (1920–1995), Chinese writer
Eileen Dunne (born 1958), Irish newsreader
Eileen Gunn (born 1945), American science fiction writer and editor
Eileen Kernaghan (born 1939), Canadian novelist
Eileen McNamara (born 1952), American columnist and professor
Eileen Myles (born 1949), American poet
Eileen Pollock (writer), American television screenwriter and producer
Eileen Power (1889–1940), British economic historian and medievalist
Eileen Tabios (born 1960), Filipino-American writer and artist
Eileen Wilks (born 1952), American fiction writer

Other
Eileen Barker (born 1938), UK professor
Eileen Caddy (1917–2006), founder of the Findhorn Foundation community
Eileen Collins (born 1956), American astronaut
Eileen de Coppet, Princess of Albania (1922–1985)
Eileen Rockefeller Growald (born 1952), daughter of David Rockefeller
Eileen McKenney, wife of American writer Nathanael West
Eileen Nearne (1921–2010), member of UK Special Operations Executive (SOE)
Eileen O'Shaughnessy, wife of British writer George Orwell
Eileen Saxon (1942–1945), infant known as "The Blue Baby"
Eileen Southern (1920–2002), African American musicologist
Eileen Tallman Sufrin (1913-1999), Canadian author and labour activist
Eileen Vidal (died 2003), kelper telephone and radio operator

Characters
Eileen Shallot, character in the novella The Dream Master
Birthday Girl: Eileen
Eileen the Crow, from the 2015 video game Bloodborne
Eileen Prince, mother of Severus Snape from the Harry Potter book series
Eileen, from the cartoon Regular Show
Eileen Galvin, from the horror video game Silent Hill 4
Eileen Grimshaw from Coronation Street
Eileen, a fairy in the charmed ridge level from Spyro: Year of the Dragon
 Eileen, a character from Tyler Perry's 2013 film A Madea Christmas
Eileen (Virtua Fighter), a character in the game Virtua Fighter 5

See also
Eileen Browne (disambiguation)
Eileen O'Connell (disambiguation)
Aileen, a given name
Aylin, a given name
Helen (disambiguation)
Ilene, a given name
Evelyn (disambiguation)

English feminine given names